Metinaro, officially Metinaro Administrative Post, is an administrative post in Dili municipality, East Timor. Its seat or administrative centre is Sabuli.

References

External links 

  – information page on Ministry of State Administration site 

Administrative posts of East Timor
Dili Municipality